Hypsipyla ereboneura is a species of snout moth in the genus Hypsipyla. It was described by Edward Meyrick in 1939 and is known from the Democratic Republic of the Congo.

References

Moths described in 1939
Phycitini
Insects of the Democratic Republic of the Congo
Moths of Africa
Endemic fauna of the Democratic Republic of the Congo